The Monitor was one of the first newspapers in Poland, printed from 1765 to 1785, during the Polish Enlightenment. It was founded in March 1765 by Ignacy Krasicki and Franciszek Bohomolec, with active support from King Stanisław August Poniatowski. It came out weekly, later semi-weekly. Its title was a tribute to the "small" Monitor published by Prince Adam Kazimierz Czartoryski. 

Inspired by the English Spectator and the spirit of rationalism and religious tolerance, Monitor has contributed to a negative view of the Polish–Lithuanian Commonwealth under the Wettin dynasty. The Monitor advocated reforms and criticized a degenerate Sarmatian culture and the abuses of "Golden Liberty."

Editors:
 Franciszek Bohomolec
 Ignacy Krasicki
 Wawrzyniec Mitzler de Kolof

See also 
 Gazeta Narodowa i Obca
 Gazeta Warszawska
 Merkuriusz Polski Ordynaryjny
 Zabawy Przyjemne i Pożyteczne (Pastimes Pleasant and Profitable)

Defunct newspapers published in Poland
Polish-language newspapers
Age of Enlightenment
Publications established in 1765
Publications disestablished in 1785
Weekly newspapers published in Poland